

From 3,000 to 3,999 

 3000 Leonardo
 
 
 
 
 
 
 
 
 
 
 
 
 
 
 3015 Candy
 
 
 
 
 
 
 
 
 
 
 
 
 
 
 
 3031 Houston
 
 
 3034 Climenhaga
 
 
 3037 Alku
 
 
 3040 Kozai
 
 
 3043 San Diego
 
 3045 Alois
 
 3047 Goethe
 
 
 
 
 
 
 3054 Strugatskia
 
 
 
 
 
 
 
 
 3063 Makhaon
 
 
 3066 McFadden
 3067 Akhmatova
 
 
 3070 Aitken
 
 
 3073 Kursk
 3074 Popov
 
 
 
 
 
 
 
 
 
 
 
 
 
 
 
 
 
 
 
 
 
 
 
 
 3099 Hergenrother
 
 
 3102 Krok
 3103 Eger
 
 
 
 
 
 
 
 
 
 
 
 
 
 
 
 
 
 
 3122 Florence
 
 
 
 
 
 
 
 
 3131 Mason-Dixon
 
 3133 Sendai
 
 
 
 3137 Horky
 
 
 
 3141 Buchar
 
 
 
 
 
 
 
 
 
 
 
 
 
 
 
 
 
 
 
 
 
 
 
 
 
 
 
 3169 Ostro
 
 
 
 
 3174 Alcock
 
 3176 Paolicchi
 
 
 
 
 3181 Ahnert
 
 
 3184 Raab
 
 
 
 
 
 
 
 3192 A'Hearn
 
 
 
 
 
 3198 Wallonia
 3199 Nefertiti
 3200 Phaethon
 3201 Sijthoff
 3202 Graff
 
 3204 Lindgren
 
 
 
 
 
 
 
 3212 Agricola
 
 
 
 
 
 
 
 
 
 
 
 
 3225 Hoag
 
 
 
 
 
 
 
 
 
 
 
 
 
 
 3240 Laocoon
 
 
 
 
 
 
 3247 Di Martino
 
 
 
 
 
 
 3254 Bus
 3255 Tholen
 
 
 
 
 
 
 
 
 
 
 
 3267 Glo
 3268 De Sanctis
 
 
 
 
 
 
 
 
 3277 Aaronson
 
 
 
 3281 Maupertuis
 
 
 
 
 
 
 3288 Seleucus
 
 3290 Azabu
 
 
 
 
 
 
 
 
 
 
 
 
 
 
 
 
 
 
 3309 Brorfelde
 
 
 
 
 
 
 
 3317 Paris
 3318 Blixen
 
 
 
 3322 Lidiya
 
 
 3325 TARDIS
 
 
 
 
 3330 Gantrisch
 
 
 3333 Schaber
 
 
 
 
 
 
 
 
 
 3343 Nedzel
 
 3345 Tarkovskij
 
 
 
 
 3350 Scobee
 
 3352 McAuliffe
 3353 Jarvis
 
 
 
 
 
 
 3360 Syrinx
 3361 Orpheus
 3362 Khufu
 
 
 
 
 3367 Alex
 
 
 
 
 
 
 
 
 
 
 
 
 
 
 
 
 
 
 
 
 
 
 
 3391 Sinon
 
 
 
 
 
 
 
 
 
 3401 Vanphilos
 3402 Wisdom
 
 
 
 3406 Omsk
 
 
 3409 Abramov
 
 
 3412 Kafka
 
 
 
 
 
 
 
 
 
 
 
 
 3425 Hurukawa
 
 
 3428 Roberts
 
 3430 Bradfield
 
 
 
 
 
 
 
 
 
 
 
 
 
 
 
 
 
 
 
 
 3451 Mentor
 
 
 
 
 
 
 
 
 
 
 
 
 
 
 
 
 
 
 
 
 
 
 
 
 
 
 
 
 
 
 
 
 
 
 
 
 
 
 
 
 
 
 3494 Purple Mountain
 
 
 
 
 
 
 
 
 
 
 
 
 
 
 
 
 
 
 
 
 
 
 
 
 
 
 
 
 
 
 
 
 
 
 
 
 
 
 
 
 
 
 3537 Jürgen
 
 
 3540 Protesilaos
 
 
 
 3544 Borodino
 
 
 
 3548 Eurybates
 
 
 3551 Verenia
 3552 Don Quixote
 3553 Mera
 3554 Amun
 
 3556 Lixiaohua
 
 
 
 
 
 
 3563 Canterbury
 3564 Talthybius
 
 
 3567 Alvema
 3568 ASCII
 
 
 
 
 
 
 
 
 
 3578 Carestia
 
 
 3581 Alvarez
 
 
 
 
 
 
 
 
 
 
 
 
 
 
 3596 Meriones
 
 
 
 
 
 
 
 
 
 
 
 
 
 
 
 
 
 
 
 
 
 
 
 
 
 
 
 
 
 
 
 3628 Božněmcová
 
 
 
 
 
 
 3635 Kreutz
 
 
 
 
 3640 Gostin
 
 3642 Frieden
 
 
 
 
 
 
 
 
 
 
 
 
 
 
 
 
 
 
 
 
 
 
 
 
 
 
 3669 Vertinskij
 
 3671 Dionysus
 
 3673 Levy
 3674 Erbisbühl
 
 
 
 
 
 
 
 3682 Welther
 
 
 
 
 3687 Dzus
 3688 Navajo
 
 
 3691 Bede
 
 
 
 
 
 
 
 
 3700 Geowilliams
 
 
 3703 Volkonskaya
 
 
 
 
 3708 Socus
 3709 Polypoites
 3710 Bogoslovskij
 
 
 
 3714 Kenrussell
 
 
 
 
 
 
 
 
 
 3724 Annenskij
 
 
 
 3728 IRAS
 
 
 
 
 
 
 
 
 3737 Beckman
 
 
 
 
 
 
 
 
 
 
 
 3749 Balam
 
 
 3752 Camillo
 3753 Cruithne
 3754 Kathleen
 
 
 3757 Anagolay
 
 
 
 
 
 
 
 
 
 
 
 
 
 3771 Alexejtolstoj
 
 
 
 
 
 
 
 
 
 
 3782 Celle
 
 
 3785 Kitami
 
 3787 Aivazovskij
 
 3789 Zhongguo
 3790 Raywilson
 
 
 3793 Leonteus
 3794 Sthenelos
 
 
 
 
 
 3800 Karayusuf
 3801 Thrasymedes
 
 
 
 
 
 
 
 
 
 
 
 
 
 
 
 
 
 
 
 
 3822 Segovia
 3823 Yorii
 
 
 
 
 
 
 
 
 
 
 
 
 
 
 
 
 
 3841 Dicicco
 
 
 3844 Lujiaxi
 
 
 
 
 
 3850 Peltier
 3851 Alhambra
 
 
 3854 George
 
 
 
 
 
 
 
 
 
 
 
 
 
 3868 Mendoza
 
 
 
 3872 Akirafujii
 3873 Roddy
 
 
 
 
 
 
 
 
 
 
 
 
 
 
 
 
 
 
 
 3893 DeLaeter
 
 
 
 
 
 
 
 
 
 
 
 3905 Doppler
 
 
 3908 Nyx
 
 
 
 
 
 
 3915 Fukushima
 
 3917 Franz Schubert
 
 
 
 
 
 
 
 
 
 
 
 
 
 
 
 
 
 
 3936 Elst
 
 
 
 
 
 
 
 
 
 
 
 
 
 
 3951 Zichichi
 
 3953 Perth
 
 
 
 
 
 
 3960 Chaliubieju
 
 3962 Valyaev
 3963 Paradzhanov
 
 
 
 
 
 
 
 
 
 
 
 
 
 
 
 
 
 
 3982 Kastelʹ
 
 
 
 
 
 3988 Huma
 
 
 
 
 
 
 
 3996 Fugaku

See also 
 List of minor planet discoverers
 List of observatory codes

References

External links 
 Discovery Circumstances: Numbered Minor Planets, Minor Planet Center

Lists of minor planets by name